Philtraea paucimacula is a species of moth in the family Geometridae first described by William Barnes and James Halliday McDunnough in 1918. It is found in North America.

The MONA or Hodges number for Philtraea paucimacula is 6850.

References

Further reading

 

Ourapterygini
Articles created by Qbugbot
Moths described in 1918